Booth Conway (August 10, 1863 – 1939) was a British-American stage and film actor. Born in New York City, he settled in England and died in Wandsworth, Greater London, at the age of 75.

Selected filmography
 The Love Trail (1915)
 The Valley of Fear (1916)
 A Pair of Spectacles (1916)
 Westward Ho! (1919)
 The Call of the Sea (1919)
 The Tavern Knight (1920)
 The Little Welsh Girl (1920)
 Married to a Mormon (1922)
 Nell Gwyn (1926)

References

External links

British male film actors
British male stage actors
20th-century British male actors
American emigrants to England
1863 births
1939 deaths
Male actors from New York City